Pelican Shores is an organized hamlet in the Fertile Belt Rural Municipality No. 183 in the Canadian province of Saskatchewan.

Demographics 

See also
 List of communities in Saskatchewan
 Hamlets of Saskatchewan

References

External links
 Municipal Directory Saskatchewan - Fertile Belt No. 183

Designated places in Saskatchewan
Organized hamlets in Saskatchewan
Fertile Belt No. 183, Saskatchewan
Division No. 5, Saskatchewan